Wheaton is a suburban city in Milton and Winfield Townships and is the county seat of DuPage County, Illinois. As of the 2020 census, Wheaton's population was 53,970, making it the 27th most populous municipality in Illinois.

History

Founding
It was not long before other settlers from New England joined them in the community. In 1848, they gave the Galena and Chicago Union Railroad three miles (5 km) of right-of-way, upon which railroad officials named the depot Wheaton. In 1850, ten blocks of land were platted and anyone who was willing to build immediately was granted free land. In 1853, the lots were surveyed and a formal plat for the community was filed with the county. The community was then incorporated as a village on February 24, 1859, with Warren serving as its first President. The village was later incorporated as a city on April 24, 1890, when the first mayor of the city was selected, Judge Elbert Gary, son of Erastus Gary and founder of Gary, Indiana.

Establishment as county seat

In 1857, the Illinois state legislature authorized an election to be held to decide the question of whether the DuPage county seat should remain in Naperville or be moved to the more centrally located Wheaton, which was on the Galena and Chicago Union Railroad. Naperville won the election by a vote of 1,542 to 762. Hostility between the two towns continued for the next decade and another election was held in 1867, in which Wheaton narrowly won by a vote of 1,686 to 1,635. At a cost of $20,000, the City of Wheaton quickly built a courthouse to house a courtroom, county offices, and a county jail. The building was dedicated on July 4, 1868.

However, animosity between the two towns continued, and in 1868, as records were moved from the old Naperville courthouse to the new courthouse in Wheaton, Naperville refused to turn over the remaining county records, prompting a band of Civil War veterans from Wheaton to conduct what came to be known as the "Midnight Raid" on the Naperville courthouse. As Wheatonites fled back on Wheaton-Naperville Road, Napervillians were able to secure some of the last remaining records, which were then taken to the Cook County Recorder in Chicago for safekeeping. During this time, Naperville was mounting a lawsuit against Wheaton accusing election judges of leaving their posts for lunch during the vote when duplicate ballot stuffing allegedly occurred. As the courts deliberated the fate of the county seat, the records were destroyed in the Great Chicago Fire of 1871. Shortly thereafter, Wheaton was officially proclaimed the county seat.

As demand for space increased, the courthouse was rebuilt in 1887 at a cost of $69,390, modeled after the courthouse in Aledo. This structure was used for the next 94 years until the county's rapid growth prompted the building of a brand new complex. The old courthouse is listed on the National Register of Historic Places, and was formerly used by National Louis University until National Louis moved to Lisle in 2004. It is currently being developed into luxury condominiums.

On November 2, 1990, the courthouse moved to a building about two miles (3 km) west in a new  complex at the corner of County Farm Road and Manchester Road. It was built at a cost of $52,500,000 and includes a  judicial building. In 1992, the county sued the architect and contractor for $4 million after several employees became ill from the ventilation system. In the end, however, the county received only $120,000 for minor repairs and the jury sided with the defendants, finding that the alleged problems were caused, primarily, by the county's negligent operation and maintenance of the ventilation system.

Expansion

Wheaton has rapidly expanded since the 1950s, although population growth has slowed since the early 1990s, as the city has become increasingly landlocked. Downtown lost much business after the county courthouse facility moved two miles (3 km) west in 1990, but in the decade since, the downtown has seen a renaissance of sorts, with the creation of several significant condominium and business developments. The six building complex includes two twenty-story high-rise buildings built in 1975.

In 1887, Wheaton prohibited the sale of alcoholic beverages, a ban which lasted until 1985 and applied to all supermarkets, convenience stores, restaurants, and other establishments.

Geography
Wheaton is located at  (41.8560218, −88.1083010).

Wheaton is the sister city of Karlskoga, Sweden. Karlskoga Street, located along the southern edge of Memorial Park in downtown Wheaton, is named after the Swedish City.

Demographics
As of the 2020 census there were 53,970 people, 19,218 households, and 13,122 families residing in the city. The racial makeup of the city was 79.01% White, 4.27% African American, 0.16% Native American, 7.50% Asian, 0.01% Pacific Islander, 2.24% from other races, and 6.81% from two or more races. Hispanic or Latino of any race were 6.49% of the population.

There were 19,218 households, out of which 61.31% had children under the age of 18 living with them, 58.66% were married couples living together, 6.35% had a female householder with no husband present, and 31.72% were non-families. 26.51% of all households were made up of individuals, and 10.01% had someone living alone who was 65 years of age or older. The average household size was 3.22 and the average family size was 2.61.

The city's age distribution consisted of 22.8% under the age of 18, 11.4% from 18 to 24, 24.7% from 25 to 44, 25.1% from 45 to 64, and 16.2% who were 65 years of age or older. The median age was 36.7 years. For every 100 females, there were 98.4 males. For every 100 females age 18 and over, there were 92.6 males.

The median income for a household in the city was $105,764, and the median income for a family was $129,579. Males had a median income of $73,771 versus $40,560 for females. The per capita income for the city was $51,688. About 3.3% of families and 5.7% of the population were below the poverty line, including 5.0% of those under age 18 and 7.3% of those age 65 or over.

In August 2010, the city was listed among the "Top 25 Highest Earning Towns" on CNNMoney, purporting a median family income of $113,517, and a median home price of $328,866, based on 2009 figures.

Economy
According to Wheaton's 2021 Comprehensive Annual Financial Report, the top employers in the city are:

Education

Higher education

Wheaton College is located just east of downtown Wheaton. Sometimes referred to as "The Harvard of Evangelical schools", Wheaton College is known for being an interdenominational destination school for devout Christian students seeking an elite liberal arts education.

Wheaton's campus features the Billy Graham Center, named for the college's most famous alumnus, which contains a museum dedicated to both the history of American evangelism and the international ministry of Billy Graham. It features conceptual exhibits intended to convey Christian ideas. Wheaton College is also home to the Todd M. Beamer Student Center, which was dedicated in 2004 to the memory of Todd Beamer, a hero from United Airlines Flight 93, and two other Wheaton alumni who died in the September 11 attacks.

The Daniel F. and Ada L. Rice Campus of the Illinois Institute of Technology is also located in Wheaton, and is home to the School of Applied Technology and offers technology-oriented education and training for working professionals.

College of DuPage, with facilities in several towns adjacent to Wheaton, serves community college students in Illinois' Community College District 502.

Private schools
Several of the private schools in Wheaton are located near the town center; in addition, St. Francis High School is on the far west side of town. Wheaton Academy moved to West Chicago in 1945.

Pre-school through eighth grade
 Clapham School, founded in 2005, is a classical school with students from pre-K through high school.
 St John Lutheran School serves students in preschool.
 St Michael Catholic Elementary School serves 580 students in preschool through eighth grade.
 Wheaton Christian Grammar School served students in kindergarten through eighth grade from 1941 to 2010, but has since moved to Winfield, while retaining its name.
 Wheaton Montessori School serves children ages 3–12 and is accredited by the Association Montessori International.
 Prairie School of Dupage located in the Theosophical Society

High schools
 St. Francis High School serves 726 students in ninth through twelfth grade.
 Wheaton Academy in West Chicago serves 632 students in ninth through twelfth grade.

Public schools
Most of Wheaton is part of Community Unit School District 200.  The Wheaton public school system is regularly listed among the finest in Illinois, with the School Board receiving the fifth consecutive Governance Award in 2020, from the Illinois Association of School Boards. A few families in the northeast corner of Wheaton reside in Glen Ellyn School District 41, and one elementary school that is located in the southeastern part of Wheaton, Briar Glen Elementary School, is part of Community Consolidated School District 89.

High schools
Wheaton North – consists of students from Monroe and Franklin Middle Schools
Wheaton Warrenville South – consists of students from Edison and Hubble Middle Schools
Glenbard South – serves students in far Southeast Wheaton who do not attend Wheaton Warrenville South High School

Middle schools
Franklin – funnels into Wheaton North High School
Hubble – funnels into Wheaton Warrenville South High School
Monroe – funnels into Wheaton North High School
Glen Crest – funnels into Glenbard South High School
Edison – funnels into Wheaton Warrenville South High School

Elementary schools

Pre-schools
Jefferson
Toddler's Campus Pre-school

Public library

The Wheaton Public Library is frequently ranked as one of the top ten libraries in the nation compared to other libraries serving similarly sized populations. In 2006, a three-story addition was added, followed by significant renovations which were completed in 2007, to bring the square footage up from 74,000 to 124,000. The annual public library budget in 2018 was $4.084 million. , the total circulation was 1,013,326, the number of items in the collection was 262,745, and the number of visitors was 525,711. The previous public library was converted into the DuPage County Historical Museum, between 1965 and 1967.

In May 2016, the library opened Café on the Park, a small restaurant located just inside the Wheaton Public Library's park-side (west) entrance.

Health care
Established in 1972 by the Wheaton Franciscan Sisters, Marianjoy Rehabilitation Hospital is a rehabilitation hospital located on the west side of Wheaton on Roosevelt Road, one half mile south of the DuPage County Government Center. It has been operated by Northwestern Medicine, since 2016. Marianjoy is a nonprofit hospital dedicated to the delivery of physical medicine and rehabilitation, with 127 beds.

Leisure and recreation

Parks and golf
The Wheaton Park District has received the National Gold Medal Award for Excellence from the National Recreation and Park Association four times, in 1984, 1990, 1996, and 2005.
The  Lincoln Marsh Natural Area, with over 300 species of prairie and wetland plants and animals, and a regionally acclaimed ropes course.
Cosley Zoo, founded in 1974, housing over 200 animals that represent over 70 species.
Two public swimming pools, the Northside Family Aquatic Center, and the Rice Pool and Water Park with three water slides, a zero-depth entry point and sand volleyball courts.
The 27-hole Arrowhead Golf Club, renamed in 1929 from the Antlers Golf Club, which was built in 1924. A new clubhouse was built in 2004–2005.
The Chicago Golf Club is a prestigious private golf club on the southside of Wheaton. It is the oldest 18-hole golf course in the nation. It has hosted numerous U.S. Open and U.S. Amateur Golf Championships in its history. In 2005, it was host to the Walker Cup.
Cantigny Park and Golf Course is the former estate of Chicago Tribune owner Robert R. McCormick and is located in southwestern Wheaton. The park contains a championship 18-hole public golf course that was the site of the 2007 US Amateur Public Links. The park also contains two museums, one relating to the Chicago Tribune, and the other devoted to the First Division of the United States Army, as Robert McCormick was a colonel in the First Division during World War I.
The Danada Forest Preserve and Equestrian Center is located on the site of the former estate of Daniel F. and Ada L. Rice, after whom Danada is named.  In the 1940s, the Rices added a barn to the estate to house horses. In 1965, their horse Lucky Debonair won the Kentucky Derby. The Danada Farm estate was acquired by the county in 1980 and 1981.
 The Illinois Prairie Path runs throughout Wheaton.

Fairgrounds
Wheaton is home to the DuPage County Fairgrounds. Organized in 1954, the DuPage County Fair Association hosts the annual DuPage County Fair in late July. The fair annually attracts major entertainers, such as Ashlee Simpson, Plain White T's (2007), Travis Tritt, Jesse McCartney, Jars of Clay, Corbin Bleu (2008), The Academy Is..., The Original Wailers (2009), and Danny Gokey (2010).

Shopping
Wheaton boasts a vibrant downtown with many restaurants, shops and services. The Downtown Wheaton Association hosts many events throughout the year to promote local businesses, including The French Market, The Chili Cookoff, Vintage Rides, Boo-palooza (Downtown Wheaton Trick-or-Treat), A Dickens of a Christmas, Wheaton Wedding Walk and Wheaton's Wine & Cultural Arts Festival.

Downtown Wheaton is also home to perhaps one of the narrowest stores in the Chicago area. The Little Popcorn Store on Front Street was formerly an alley between two buildings, and features the exposed brick walls of its neighbors. The store has been around since the 1920s and sells candy for as little as 2¢ apiece, and fresh popcorn. 

Other shopping districts in Wheaton include Danada Square West, and Danada Square East, named after Dan and Ada Rice, located on the north side of Illinois Route 56 (Butterfield Road), on the west and east side of Naperville Road. Just east of Danada Square East is Rice Lake Square, another open air shopping center. Just north of Danada Square East, along Naperville Road, is Town Square Wheaton, which was built in 1992, and is a mixed-use lifestyle center featuring clothing boutiques and restaurants. Other shopping areas include the Roosevelt Road and Geneva Road corridors.

Theater
Wheaton is also home to the historic Grand Theater, built in 1925. In recent years, the theater and volunteers undertook a restoration to its original state, complete with a lighted dome ceiling dotted with stars, and a newly painted floor. It celebrated its grand reopening on May 11, 2002, and on August 25, 2005, the theater was placed on the National Register of Historic Places. There was a sense of growing pessimism that the theater would ever be restored, due to lack of progress and funds. However, there was cause for hope when on January 23, 2010, when many cast members of the off-Broadway show Jersey Boys raised approximately $50,000 for restoration.

On July 10, 2010, the Grand Theater Corp. surrendered the deed to the building, to Suburban Bank and Trust Co, due in part to being delinquent on a $800,000 loan, carried by Suburban Bank and Trust Co.

On November 30, 2012, Jim Atten bought the building, intending to reopen it soon.  Since then he has been repairing the property and leading the effort to remove temporary structures within the theater. He has worked closely with an architect and the city staff as the effort progresses. According to the Daily Herald newspaper, it will take an estimated $5 million to get the theater up and running again.

Government
In the United States House of Representatives, Wheaton is located in Illinois's 6th congressional district, which is held by Democrat Sean Casten.

Religious institutions
Wheaton has forty-five churches located within city limits and an additional thirty places of worship in the outlying unincorporated areas, representing nearly forty religious denominations. The Genius Edition of Trivial Pursuit states that Wheaton has the "second most churches per capita in America."

Built in 1926, the national headquarters of the Theosophical Society in America is located on a  estate on the north side of Wheaton.

Wheaton is also the North American headquarters for the Institute of the Blessed Virgin Mary, which moved into its new home in June 1946.

On March 18, 2002, St. Michael Catholic Church in downtown Wheaton was destroyed by arson by a Wheaton resident and parishioner, Adam Palinski, now serving 39 years in prison. He lost his appeal, but still maintains his innocence. The church has since been rebuilt at a cost of $13 million, and reopened on March 18, 2006.

Islamic Center of Wheaton (ICW) became the first mosque in Wheaton in September 2013.

Notable people

Transportation

Rail

The Union Pacific / West Line runs through downtown Wheaton and has been a staple of Wheaton since its founding. Metra has two stops along the line in Wheaton, one at College Avenue serving Wheaton College, and another at West Street in the heart of downtown Wheaton. It passes under a bridge just west of downtown, and over County Farm Road, just north of the DuPage County Government Complex.

Formerly, Wheaton was also served by the Chicago Aurora and Elgin Railroad. The CA&E right-of-way now constitutes the Illinois Prairie Path. Carlton Ave, UP Railroad, West St., and Childs St. are the borders of the site of the CA&E's headquarters and storage and maintenance facilities.

Highways
Wheaton Provides Access To 2 Interstate Highways:

▪️I-355 (Veterans Memorial Tollway), Full Access To 355 can Be found at North Ave, Roosevelt Rd, or Butterfield Rd

▪️I-88 (Regan Memorial Tollway), Full Access To 88 can be found at Naperville Rd/Freedom Dr or Winfield Rd just west of the city

Two Illinois State Routes run east–west through Wheaton:

Illinois Route 38, also known as Roosevelt Road, runs through the center of Wheaton. On its route are many car dealerships, restaurants, St. Francis High School, and Marianjoy Rehabilitation Hospital. Downtown Wheaton is about half a mile north.
Illinois Route 56, also known as Butterfield Road, runs through southern Wheaton. On its route is the Danada Shopping complex (among other shopping complexes), DuPage County Forest Preserves including the Danada House and equestrian area, Arrowhead Golf Course, subdivisions, including Briarcliffe, Stonehedge, Arrowhead and Scottdale, along with Wheaton Warrenville South High School.

▪️Illinois Route 64, also known as North Ave, is an east–west route that runs just north of Wheaton city limits. Access to North Ave from Wheaton can be from County Farm Rd, Gary Ave, or Main St (turns into Schmale Rd at Geneva Rd). North Ave is a very busy highway-type road because it connects to Interstates such as I-355, I-294, and I-290.

Other roads include:

Blanchard Street, a north–south road, runs from just south of the Union Pacific/West Line to its intersection with Naperville Road at the north end of the Danada complex.
County Farm Road, a north–south road, runs from Roosevelt Road at St. Francis High School through Geneva Road, passing by the DuPage County Government Complex. It is entirely County Highway 43 in Wheaton.
Gary Avenue, a north–south road, runs from downtown Wheaton at Front Street through Geneva Road. It is known as County Highway 23 from Jewell Road northward. On its route are Cosley Zoo, the Lincoln Marsh, and Wheaton North High School. It serves, along with Main Street, as a primary route to Carol Stream and Bloomingdale.
Geneva Road, an east–west road at the northern border of Wheaton, which includes Wheaton Bowl, Wheaton North High School, and the national headquarters of the Theosophical Society in America on its route. It is known as County Highway 21. It serves as a route to Winfield, West Chicago and further to the west, Glen Ellyn to the east.
Main Street, a north–south road that runs from south-central Wheaton through Geneva Road where it continues as Schmale Road, which serves, along with Gary Avenue, as a primary route to Carol Stream and Bloomingdale to the north.
Naperville Road, a north–south road, runs from Butterfield Road in the south to just past Roosevelt Road in central Wheaton. It is County Highway 23. It primarily runs through the Danada Shopping complex and the Farnham subdivision and serves as a primary route to Warrenville and Naperville to the south.
President Street, a north–south road, runs from its intersection with Blanchard Street north of the Danada complex through Geneva Road, passing through the Union Pacific/West Line Roosevelt Road. Its route runs near Wheaton College.

Notes

References

Further reading

External links

Downtown Wheaton Association
Wheaton Center for History
Wheaton Chamber of Commerce
Wheaton, Illinois profile at City-Data

 
1831 establishments in Illinois
Chicago metropolitan area
Cities in DuPage County, Illinois
Cities in Illinois
County seats in Illinois
Populated places established in 1831